Senator Morgan may refer to:

Members of the Northern Irish Senate
William James Morgan (1914–1999), Northern Irish Senator from 1969 to 1970

Members of the United States Senate
Edwin D. Morgan (1811–1883), U.S. Senator from New York from 1863 to 1869
John Tyler Morgan (1824–1907), U.S. senator from Alabama from 1877 to 1907
Robert Burren Morgan (1925–2016), U.S. Senator from North Carolina from 1975 to 1981

United States state senate members
B. F. Morgan (1858–1922), South Dakota State Senate
Becky Morgan (politician) (born 1938), California State Senate
George Morgan (New York) (1816–1879), New York State Senate
James B. Morgan (1833–1892), Mississippi State Senate
James G. Morgan (1885–1964), Missouri State Senate
Jedediah Morgan (1774–1826), New York State Senate
John T. Morgan (judge) ( 1830–1910), Illinois State Senate
Karen Morgan (born 1952), Utah State Senate
Lewis H. Morgan (1818–1881), New York State Senate
Lyman Morgan (1814–1896), Wisconsin State Senate
Mike Morgan (politician) (born 1955), Oklahoma State Senate
William Albert Morgan (1841–1917), Kansas State Senate

See also
Morgan Morgans (1806–1889), Connecticut State Senate